You and I is the second studio album by R&B singer O'Bryan.

Reception

The album was named after O'Bryan's cover of the Stevie Wonder ballad. Given a more contemporary twist, the title track was the second single (peaking at No. 19 on the Billboard R&B Singles charts) and since has become one of O’Bryan’s signature songs.

The lead single, “I’m Freaky”, was an upbeat, synth-funk song that peaked at No. 15 on the Billboard R&B Singles charts. Album tracks also receiving notice and airplay were the romantic “Together Always”; the fluid instrumental “Soft Touch”; and the energetic “Soul Train’s A Comin’”, which became the theme song for the television dance show "Soul Train" from 1983 to 1987 (the original mix was only used on Soul Train for a few months before changing to a remixed version). The album peaked at No. 13 on the Billboard R&B Albums chart.

Track listing

Charts

Weekly charts

Year-end charts

Singles

Personnel
O'Bryan  – lead vocals, background vocals, synthesizers, acoustic piano, multiple other instruments on all tracks
Andy Cleaves – trumpet
Melvin Davis – bass guitar, piccolo bass, acoustic piano, Fender Rhodes piano
Karl Denson – alto saxophone
Darrell Frias – electric guitar, acoustic guitar
Johnny McGhee – electric guitar, acoustic guitar
Chuck Morris – drums on "Together Always"
Raphael Hardison – background vocals
Marvin James – background vocals

References

External links
 O'Bryan-You And I at Discogs

1983 albums
O'Bryan albums
Capitol Records albums